William Thorn (3 September 1852 – 1 February 1935) was a grazier and politician in Queensland, Australia. He was a Member of the Queensland Legislative Assembly.

Early life
William Thorn was born in September 1852 in Ipswich, Queensland, the son of George Thorn and his wife Jane, née Hancock.

Politics
William Thorn was elected to the Queensland Legislative Assembly in the electoral district of Aubigny from 1894 to 1904 and again from 1908 to 1912.

Later life
William Thorn died on 1 February 1935 at his son's pastoral property Milford Rocks, Crows Nest, Queensland and was buried in Drayton and Toowoomba Cemetery.

References

External links

  — description of the Milford Rocks property in 2011

Members of the Queensland Legislative Assembly
Burials in Drayton and Toowoomba Cemetery
1852 births
1935 deaths